Jukka Toijala (born 9 May 1972) is a Finnish professional basketball coach and former player, currently serving as the coach for HBA-Marsky Helsinki, and the Estonia men's national basketball team.

Coaching career

Club coaching career
From 2010 to 2016, Toijala coached Finnish team Kataja Basket.

From 2016 until 2019, he was the head coach of Steaua București in the Romanian first league.

Since 2019, Toijala is the head coach of HBA-Marsky Helsinki in the Finnish second league.

National team coaching career
Since 2010, Toijala has been the assistant coach of the senior Finnish national basketball team.

On 23 October 2019, Jukka Toijala became head coach of the Estonian men's national basketball team.

References

External links
 Eurobasket.com profile
 RealGM profile

Videos
 Jukka Toijala - 19.4.2011 - Youtube.com video 

1972 births
Living people
Finnish basketball coaches
Finnish men's basketball players
People from Kouvola
Sportspeople from Kymenlaakso
Estonia national basketball team coaches
Finnish expatriate basketball people in Estonia
Finnish expatriate basketball people in Romania